Tisis amabilis is a moth in the family Lecithoceridae. It was described by Kyu-Tek Park in 2003. It is found on Sabah in Malaysia.

The wingspan is about 22 mm for males and 19–20 mm for females. The forewings are light orange with a transverse dark brown, leaden-metallic band from two-fifths of the costa, connected to the costal streak from the base. There is a golden yellow area before and beyond this band, as well as a dark brown, leaden-metallic area before three-fifths.

Etymology
The species name refers to the colour pattern of the forewings and is derived from Latin amabilis (meaning beauty).

References

Moths described in 2003
Tisis